HMS Cornwallis was a 74-gun third rate ship of the line of the Royal Navy, launched on 12 May 1813 at Bombay. She was built of teak. The capture of Java by  delayed the completion of Cornwallis as Java had been bringing her copper sheathing from England.

On  27 April 1815, Cornwallis engaged the American sloop , which had mistaken Cornwallis for a merchant ship.  Heavily outgunned, Hornet was forced to retreat. The crew threw boats, guns and other equipment overboard in order to escape.

After China's defeat in the First Opium War, representatives from the British and Qing Empires negotiated a peace treaty aboard Cornwallis in Nanjing. On 29 August 1842, British representative Sir Henry Pottinger and Qing representatives, Qiying, Yilibu and Niujian, signed the Treaty of Nanking aboard her.

Cornwallis was fitted with screw propulsion and reduced to 60 guns in 1855, and took part in the Crimean War, where she was commanded by George Wellesley, future admiral and First Sea Lord, and the nephew of the Duke of Wellington.

She was converted to a jetty at Sheerness in 1865. In 1916 she was renamed  and used as a base ship. She was finally broken up in 1957 at Sheerness, some 144 years after her launching.

Citations and references
Citations

References

Lavery, Brian (2003) The Ship of the Line - Volume 1: The development of the battlefleet 1650-1850. Conway Maritime Press. .
Parkinson, C. Northcote (1954) War in the Eastern Seas, 1793-1815. (London: George Allen & Unwin), p. 421.

 

1813 ships
British ships built in India
Crimean War naval ships of the United Kingdom
First Opium War ships of the United Kingdom
Ships of the line of the Royal Navy
Vengeur-class ships of the line
War of 1812 ships of the United Kingdom